Hazal Sarıkaya (born on 4 September 1996 in Istanbul, Turkey) is a Turkish swimmer competing in backstroke events. She is a member of FMV Işık Sport Club in Istanbul.

Sarıkaya won the silver medal at the Swim Cup held in Amsterdam, Netherlands with a score of 29.68.

She is the holder of several national records in backstroke.

She was invited to participate in the 100 m backstroke event at the 2012 Summer Olympics.

Personal bests
 50 m backstroke: 29.10 NR - 30 April 2011 Balkan Junior  Championships, Banja Luka, Bosnia and Herzegovina
 100 m backstroke: 1:02.58 NR - 25 March 2011 French Championships, Strasbourg, France
 2:15.40 200 m backstroke: 2:15.40 NR - 6 July 2011 European Junior Championships, Belgrade, Serbia
 4 × 100 m medley relay: 4:07.56 NR - 27 May 2012 European Aquatics Championships, Debrecen, Hungary

Achievements

See also
 Turkish women in sports

References

1996 births
Sportspeople from Istanbul
Turkish female backstroke swimmers
Turkish female swimmers
Living people
Olympic swimmers of Turkey
Swimmers at the 2012 Summer Olympics
Swimmers at the 2013 Mediterranean Games
Mediterranean Games competitors for Turkey